Simply Ordinary is a 1998 Hong Kong martial arts television series produced by TVB and stars Gordon Lam as famed martial artist Lam Sai-wing, who was also a known disciple of folk hero Wong Fei-hung. The series tells a largely fictional story of Lam before he became Wong's disciple.

Plot
Lam Sai-wing (Gordon Lam) was an honest butcher who had great butchering skills. He was very popular among his fellow villagers and was later nominated as the village headman. Wing met Mary (Jay Lau), who came back from abroad, and wanted to pursue her. However, Mary actually wanted to use Wing to help her father to smuggle national treasures to abroad. Wing's cousin Tai (Kenix Kwok) knew about this fraud and warned him. Wing could not tell between truths and lies and was stuck between wealth, fame and love.

Cast
Gordon Lam as Lam Sai-wing
Kenix Kwok as Kam Nga-tai
Yung Kam-cheung as Shek Sai-fung
Jay Lau as Mary Chu
King Kong Lam as Kam Nga-wong
Chor Yuen as Village Head Lo
Cheung Kwok-keung as Ho Ka-po
Teresa Ha as Shum Yu
Wong Ching as Ho Tai

See also
The Return of Wong Fei Hung, a 1984 television series also produced by TVB which also tells the story of Lam Sai-wing.
Magnificent Butcher, a 1979 film which also tells the story of Lam Sai-wing.
List of TVB series (1998)

External links
Official Website

TVB dramas
Martial arts television series
Hong Kong action television series
Period television series
1998 Hong Kong television series debuts
1998 Hong Kong television series endings
Television series set in the Qing dynasty
Television shows set in Guangdong